Koilada is a village and a former municipality in the Larissa regional unit, Thessaly, Greece. Since the 2011 local government reform it is part of the municipality Larissa, of which it is a municipal unit. Population 3,169 (2011). The municipal unit has an area of 162.299 km2.

References

Populated places in Larissa (regional unit)